Illinois Township is one of nineteen current townships in Pope County, Arkansas, USA. As of the 2010 census, its total population was 29,813, with 91.8 percent (approx. 27,370 people) contained in urban Russellville.

Geography

Cities, towns, and villages
 Bernice
 Bethel
 Pottsville (part)
 Russellville (part)
 New Hope
 North Dardanelle

Hydrology
The township contains Lake Dardanelle and Lake Dardanelle State Park.

References
 United States Census Bureau 2008 TIGER/Line Shapefiles
 United States Board on Geographic Names (GNIS)
 United States National Atlas

External links
 US-Counties.com
 City-Data.com

Townships in Pope County, Arkansas
Townships in Arkansas
Arkansas placenames of Native American origin